Ome, is a  public island in the lagoon of Bora Bora in French Polynesia.
It is the located between Mute, and Temahu.
Former island of Tooparopae is now adjoined to Ome in its western point.

Administration
The island is part of Bora Bora Commune.
the population of the island, mostly the resort staff, are working in tourism and fishing industry. 
On the south end of the island, some private properties of famous actors.

Tourism
The island is the location of the Chez Alice resort

Transportation

After arriving in Fa'a'ā International Airport, an Air Tahiti inter-island flight (50 minutes) will bring you to Bora Bora Airport.

References

External links